Lieutenant General Frans van den Berg  was an artillery officer who was appointed as the first Chief of Staff Planning in the SADF in 1986.

Early life

He was born in Kimberley and matriculated from Potchefstroom Boys High School.

Military career

He joined the Union Defence Force and served in the artillery. He was an instructor at the Army Gymnasium, he completed the British Long Gunnery Staff Course. Chief Instructor Gunnery at the School of Artillery & Armour. Officer Commanding School of Artillery from 1970 to 1973, OC North Western Command 1974–1977, OC Northen Transvaal Command 1982–1983. Much later served as Chief of Staff Planning from 1986 to 1991.

Awards and decorations

References

|-

|-

|-

|-

|-

|-

Year of birth missing
South African Army generals
Afrikaner people
South African people of Dutch descent
South African anti-communists
South African military personnel of the Border War
Military attachés
Stellenbosch University alumni